Rochdale Association Football Club is a professional football club based in the town of Rochdale, Lancashire, England. The team currently compete in League Two, the fourth tier of the English football league system. Nicknamed 'The Dale', they have played home matches at Spotland Stadium since 1920 and contested derby matches with the now expelled Bury.

Founded in 1907, Rochdale entered the Lancashire Combination and after securing promotion out of Division Two in 1909–10 they won the Division One title in 1910–11 and 1911–12. They then switched to the Central League, before being invited into the Football League when the Third Division North was created in 1921. The club remained in the division for 47 years but were relegated out of the new nationwide Third Division in 1959. They reached the League Cup final in 1962 and secured promotion out of the Fourth Division in 1968–69. Relegated in 1974, Rochdale remained in the fourth tier for 36 seasons after unsuccessful play-off campaigns in 2002, 2008 and 2009. The club finally secured promotion in 2009–10 and following relegation in 2012 were  promoted to the third tier for a third time in 2013–14, but were relegated back to League Two in 2020–21.

History

Rochdale played 36 consecutive seasons in the Football League's bottom division from 1974 to 2010, the longest time any team has been in the bottom division of the League, with some even derisively calling it "the Rochdale Division". The club has the lowest average position of all the clubs which have existed continuously in the Football League since its expansion to four divisions in 1921–22 (76th) and since its expansion to 92 clubs in 1950–51 (79th). Additionally, the club holds the distinction of having played the most seasons in the English Football League without either reaching the top two tiers (91 seasons as of 2018–19) or being relegated to the National League.

The club reached the League Cup Final in 1962. This was the first time a club from the bottom league division had reached the final of a major competition – where they lost to Norwich City.

During its history, the club has had three promotions and four relegations, with promotion coming in 1969 and 2010 and 2014 and relegation in 1959, 1974, 2012 and 2021. The 1959 relegation followed the 1958 restructuring which saw the combination of the two Third Division sections into the Third Division and Fourth Division. In the restructuring, Rochdale managed to secure a spot in the Third Division but was relegated at the end of the season to the now lowest Fourth Division.

1907–1999

Rochdale A.F.C. was formed in 1907. After World War I the Football League was expanded and the club unsuccessfully applied to join. In 1921 Rochdale was recommended to be included in the new Third Division North, and played their first League game at home against Accrington Stanley on 27 August 1921, winning 6–3. However, this first season ended with the club at the bottom of the League, having to reapply for membership.

The club reached the League Cup Final in 1962 led by Tony Collins. This was the first time a club from the bottom league division had reached the final of a major competition – where they lost to Norwich City 4–0 on aggregate. Rochdale had beaten Southampton, Doncaster Rovers, Charlton Athletic, York City, and Blackburn Rovers on their route to the final.

The club's first promotion came in 1969, earned by a team largely assembled by manager Bob Stokoe, though it was Stokoe's assistant, Len Richley who steered Rochdale to promotion after Stokoe moved to Carlisle United. In the early stages of the 1969–70 season, Rochdale topped the Third Division table, sparking hopes of a second successive promotion. The team's form significantly declined around Christmas 1969, however, and a failure to halt the team's decline led to the dismissal of Richley. He was succeeded by Dick Conner, who stabilised the club's form and steered them to a 9th-place finish. The following three seasons saw the club finish in the lower reaches of the Third Division table, narrowly avoiding relegation each time. The board viewed merely surviving in the Third Division as unacceptable and replaced Conner with Walter Joyce for the 1973–74 season. This move failed to pay off, and Rochdale was relegated after a campaign in which they won only 2 of 46 league games.

The club finished bottom of the league in 1977–78 but was successful in their bid for re-election. Southport, which had finished one place above Rochdale, was demoted instead and replaced by Wigan Athletic. Rochdale finished bottom for a second time in 1979–80, but was again re-elected – by one vote over Altrincham. In 1989–90 the club reached the fifth round of the FA Cup for the first time but lost 1–0 to Crystal Palace.

Steve Parkin was appointed as manager in 1998, a period in which the success of the club improved significantly with the emergence of talented players such as Gary Jones, Clive Platt, Grant Holt and Kevin Townson.

2000–2010
Parkin left to take over at Barnsley in November 2001 with Rochdale second in the Third Division. This gained him little popularity with the fans, especially when he took Gary Jones with him. John Hollins was appointed as his successor and the club finished the season in 5th place, entering the promotion play-offs where they lost to Rushden & Diamonds in the semi-final.

The club reached the fifth round of the FA Cup again the following season, but lost 3–1 at Wolves. Hollins was replaced by Paul Simpson in 2002, and Alan Buckley, appointed and sacked as manager in 2003. Parkin then returned to the club as manager, until being sacked in December 2006.

Parkin's replacement, Keith Hill, who was initially appointed as caretaker manager, became arguably the club's most successful manager to date. Hill and his assistant manager David Flitcroft led Rochdale to a 5th-place finish in 2007–08, securing a play-off place. After beating Darlington 5–4 on penalties in the semi-final, Rochdale reached Wembley for the first time in their history. Despite taking the lead in the match, they lost the final 3–2 to Stockport County.

In the 2008–09 season, Rochdale reached the League Two playoffs for the second consecutive season, finishing 6th in the table on 70 points. Rochdale lost 2–1 on aggregate to Gillingham in the playoff semi-finals. Season 2009–10 ended a 41-year wait for promotion with a win over Northampton Town as Rochdale secured the third automatic promotion spot. Rochdale continued their progression under Keith Hill, now with the club for 3 years, with a secured spot in League One in 2010–11. In 2010–11 Rochdale finished 9th in league one with 68 points, equalling their highest league finish since 1969–70.

2010–2014

On 1 June 2011 manager Keith Hill joined Championship club Barnsley. Former Manchester City apprentice and youth coach Steve Eyre was confirmed as Hill's replacement on 12 June 2011. Eyre's spell at Spotland did not last long, as he was sacked after 27 competitive games in charge, the team having recorded just 4 league wins in this time. Eyre's last game was a 0–0 draw against Yeovil, in which Yeovil's keeper Rene Gilmartin played the second half with a dislocated finger. Director of youth Chris Beech was then appointed as caretaker manager. Under Beech's first game in charge, the team drew 1–1 with Preston North End with an equaliser from Daniel Bogdanović who scored on his debut. Beech's 5 games in charge ended with a 5–1 defeat by Stevenage and a 3–0 defeat to bottom of league Wycombe Wanderers.

On 24 January 2012, Accrington Stanley's John Coleman was confirmed manager as the successor to Steve Eyre and left his club where he had been for more than a decade. John Coleman's first match in charge was a 3–0 win at home over Bury in the local derby. However, on 21 April, Rochdale lost 2–1 to Chesterfield resulting in relegation from League One after two years in the league. John Coleman's and Jimmy Bell's contracts were terminated by Rochdale on 21 January 2013 following a poor run in form. In January 2013, Keith Hill, previously in charge of Rochdale from 2007 to 2011, was appointed as the new manager.

The 2013–14 season was much more successful for Rochdale, they were promoted to League One in third-place on 26 April 2014, after beating Cheltenham Town 2–0. One of the highlights of the season was reaching the fourth round of the FA Cup for the first time in eleven years after beating Championship side Leeds United 2–0.

Return to League One (2014–2021)
Playing at the club's highest level, the 2014–15 season was the club's most successful yet. Rochdale missed out on the playoffs by six points, eventually finishing in 8th place, their highest league placing. The club impressed in the FA Cup again, this time reaching the fourth round, losing out 4–1 to Premier League side Stoke City. The 2015–16 season saw Rochdale finish 10th in League One, whilst they finished 9th in 2016–17.

In 2017–18, Rochdale narrowly avoided relegation, finishing 20th in League One. Despite a poor domestic season, Rochdale reached the fifth round of the FA Cup where they met Premier League side Tottenham Hotspur at Spotland. Rochdale held Tottenham to a 2–2 draw, resulting in a replay at Wembley Stadium where Rochdale lost out 6–1. On 4 March 2019, Rochdale sacked manager Keith Hill after six years in charge: with Rochdale in 22nd place. Hill was replaced by Brian Barry-Murphy who led Rochdale to 16th place in the 2018–19 season. In the 2019–20 season, Rochdale reached the third round of the EFL Cup where they lost 5–3 on penalties at Old Trafford against Manchester United after holding the Red Devils to a 1–1 draw in normal time in front of 5,500 travelling supporters. Rochdale also reached the FA Cup third round where they managed a 1–1 home draw with Premier League side Newcastle United, before losing the replay 4–1 at St James' Park. However, the COVID-19 pandemic forced the cancellation of the season after 34 matches. Final league positions were decided on a points per game basis, with Rochdale finishing in 18th place.

League Two (2021–)
After finishing 21st, Rochdale were relegated from League One at the end of the 2020–21 season, and finished 18th in their first League Two campaign. The club started the 2022–23 season with five straight defeats, and sacked manager Robbie Stockdale in mid-August 2022; the side's first league win came in their 10th game, away at Colchester United, overseen by Jim Bentley who had been appointed manager on 29 August. Also in August 2022, Rochdale settled a High Court action regarding an attempted hostile takeover of the club by investors Morton House MGT in July 2021; in October 2022, Rochdale were given a six-point penalty, suspended for two years, for failing to comply with EFL regulations over the attempted takeover.

Club badge and colours

The club crest used by Rochdale AFC is a variant of the arms of the former County Borough of Rochdale. The coat of arms, based on those of the local and reputed Rochdale family with certain additions, was granted to the Borough by Herald's College in 1857. At its centre, a shield shows a sack of wool and a cotton plant, representing the local wool and cotton industries. Around the edge of the shield sit eight martlets (birds). These are taken from the Rochdale family coat of arms (mentioned above) and are widely used on heraldic devices. Above the shield and helm (in the position technically known as the "crest" in heraldry) more local industry representations are made by the inclusion of a fleece of wool (suspended by a band) and the iron centre of an old mill-stone (known as a mill-rind).

A motto below the shield reads Crede Signo. Roughly translated, this means "Believe in the sign". The blazon (official heraldic description) for the arms reads as follows: "Argent a woolpack encircled by two branches of the cotton tree flowered and conjoint proper; a bordure sable charged with eight martlets of the field; and for a crest on a wreath of the colours a mill-rind sable and above a fleece argent banded or."

When Rochdale Metropolitan Borough Council was formed in 1974, a new coat of arms was created and awarded for council use. Rochdale A.F.C., however, retained their variant of the old Rochdale County Borough arms.

Rochdale's current home colours are black and blue shirts, white shorts and blue and black hooped socks. Previously, Rochdale's usual colours were blue and white, introduced in 1949. Prior to this, Rochdale wore black and white stripes, which was influenced by the strong Newcastle United side of 1907 (the year Rochdale was formed), the stripe which they adopted for their centenary season in 2007.

This black and white kit was re-introduced in the 2007–08 season as the one-off centenary kit; the new Internazionale-influenced design which succeeded it was an amalgamation of the striped kit and the blue kit to herald the second century of Rochdale's existence. Between 2010 and 2012 Rochdale's shirts were predominantly blue with black pinstripes on the body and black sleeves.

Rochdale's away kit comprises white shirts with a purple stripe, purple shorts and purple and white hooped socks. Other historical away kits have included yellow, teal, green and red. Other kits have included white shirts with black shorts, white shirts with blue shorts and a blue shirt with white sleeves.

Kit manufacturers and shirt sponsors
Rochdale has had sponsored shirts since 1983. Former sponsors include Carcraft, MMC Estates, All-in-One Garden Centre, Smith Metals, Keytech, Freebets.co.uk, Cabrini and the Co-operative. On 28 May 2013, Crown Oil was unveiled as the club's new principal sponsor.

It was announced in June 2009 that the kit supplier for the next three seasons would be Carbrini.

From 2012 to 2015 Rochdale's kit was supplied by Fila.

On 25 April 2015, Rochdale revealed Erreà as their new supplier.

Stadium
Rochdale plays their home matches at Spotland Stadium, known locally as just Spotland, and currently named the Crown Oil Arena as part of a sponsorship deal by the Bury-based fuel company Crown Oil. The stadium was officially opened in 1920, and was used exclusively by Rochdale for the first 68 years of its existence. From 1988 to 2016 the ground was jointly owned by the football club, Rochdale Council and rugby league club Rochdale Hornets. In 2016 Rochdale A.F.C. bought the stadium shares they did not hold to own 100% of Spotland Stadium.

Apart from local football and rugby league, Spotland has also hosted minor nations' rugby league matches, British Amateur Rugby League Association matches, and also the National League Cup finals of 2003 and 2004. Spotland was a venue for the 2013 Rugby League World Cup, hosting a match between Fiji and Ireland - the first time that Rochdale had staged an event in any sporting World Cup. The event was almost sold out with almost 9,000 people attending. This was incorrectly claimed to be a new stadium record, but Rochdale had 24,231 for an FA Cup tie vs Notts County in December 1949 and three higher crowds for FA Cup and play-off games between 1990 and 2008 against Northampton Town, Coventry City and Darlington.

Today Spotland has a capacity of 10,249 in four stands: the Co-Operative Stand (or Main Stand), the Thwaites Beer Stand (the Sandy Lane End), the T.D.S Stand (Pearl Street end) and the Westrose Leisure Stand (the Willbutts Lane Stand). All are fully seated, apart from the Sandy Lane End, which is a small terrace behind one of the goals.

The Main Stand features a statue of a long-standing Rochdale fan, David Clough, situated where he watched matches as a season-ticket holder. He had helped the club raise funds and left £250,000 to the club in his will when he died in 2020. The statue was unveiled in September 2021.

Rivalries
Rochdale have a number of rivalries with both local and non-local clubs. The club's main rivals are Bury. Bury, after Oldham, were the closest Football League club to Rochdale, and the fixture was also known as the South Lancashire Derby. However, Bury's expulsion from the Football League during the 2019–20 season means that any meetings between the clubs are unlikely in the near future. Rochdale's other significant rivalries have been with Oldham Athletic, Burnley, Halifax Town.  

Rochdale also have lesser rivalries with Stockport County, Wigan Athletic, Bolton Wanderers, Accrington Stanley and Bradford City.

Players

Current squad

Former players

Club officials

Board of directors

Coaching and medical staff

Honours

Domestic

League
Third Division North / League One (3rd tier) 
 Runners–up (2): 1923–24, 1926–27
League Two / Football League Fourth Division (4th tier)
 Promotion (3): 1968–69, 2009–10, 2013–14
Lancashire Combination Division Two:
Promotion (1): 1909–10

Cups
 Football League Cup:
 Runners–up: 1961–62
 Lancashire Cup:
 Winners (3): 1948–49, 1970–1971, 2004–05

Club records
 Record League victory – 8–1 v. Chesterfield (18 December 1926)
 Fewest league wins in a season – 2 1973–74
 Most points gained in a season – 82 2009–10 Football League Two
 Highest home attendance – 24,231 v. Notts County 1949–50
 Record league appearances – Gary Jones (464)
 Record league goalscorer – Reg Jenkins (119)
 Most league goals in one season – Albert Whitehurst (44 in 1926–27)
 Highest transfer fee paid – £150,000 to Stoke City for Paul Connor, 2001
 Highest transfer fee received – £1,000,000 Wolverhampton Wanderers for Luke Matheson, 2020

See also
 List of Rochdale A.F.C. players

References

External links

 
1907 establishments in England
Association football clubs established in 1907
Football clubs in England
Football clubs in Rochdale
Lancashire Combination
Lancashire League (football)
The Central League
English Football League clubs
Football clubs in Lancashire